Haute-Picardie TGV station (French: Gare de TGV Haute-Picardie) is a railway station on the LGV Nord-Europe between Lille and Paris.

Overview
When built, it was criticised by the press for being too far from any of the neighbouring towns to be useful. It was located near a trunk road rather than a connecting railway line: it was often nicknamed la gare des betteraves, or 'sugar beet station', as it is surrounded by sugar beet fields, as it was the case for some rail stations in the countryside at the beginning of the twentieth century, when those vegetables were still transported almost exclusively by train to the nearest sugar refinery.

Today, the station is connected with the two local main cities, namely Amiens to the west and Saint Quentin to the east, by the A29 motorway – it takes around 30 minutes to reach either city and a bus shuttle service operates four times per day.

The annual number of passengers varies from 360,000 to 400,000.

At most stations on high-speed lines there is some form of barrier preventing this close up viewing from the platform. Since 2013, passengers are not allowed onto the platforms until the arrival of the next stopping train, in order to avoid any risk of being hit by flying track ballast.

There is a business park close to the station.

References

External links

 

Haute-Picardie
Railway stations in France opened in 1994